Saint-Genest-de-Contest (Languedocien: Sent Guinièis) is a commune in the Tarn department in southern France.

Geography
The Dadou forms the commune's northern border.

See also
Communes of the Tarn department

References

Communes of Tarn (department)